Grant Connell and Glenn Michibata were the defending champions, but lost in the semifinals to tournament runners-up Ken Flach and Robert Seguso.

Scott Davis and David Pate won the title by defeating Ken Flach and Robert Seguso 6–4, 6–2 in the final.

Seeds
The first four seeds received a bye to the second round.

Draw

Finals

Top half

Bottom half

References

External links
 Official results archive (ATP)
 Official results archive (ITF)

Sovran Bank Classic Doubles